Qaleh Juq (also Romanized as Qal‘eh Jūq; also known as Kaladzhukh, Qal’eh, and Qal‘eh Joq) is a village in Karasf Rural District, in the Central District of Khodabandeh County, Zanjan Province, Iran. At the 2006 census, its population was 506, in 115 families.

References 

Populated places in Khodabandeh County